is a Japanese voice actress from Tokyo, Japan. She is best known for her roles as Naru Osaka in Sailor Moon, Suzuko in Mahô tsukai Sally (1980s remake), and voiced Videl in Dragon Ball Kai while her original voice actor, Yūko Minaguchi was on a hiatus. Kakinuma is married to fellow voice actor Toshio Furukawa and is attached to Aoni Production.

Filmography

Anime television
Dream 9 Toriko & One Piece & Dragon Ball Z Chō Collaboration Special!! (Videl)
GeGeGe no Kitarō 1985 series
GeGeGe no Kitarō 1996 series
Goldfish Warning! (Chieiko (ep. 15))
Hello! Lady Lynn (Peggy)
Kemonozume (Rie Kakinoki)
Lady Lady!! (Jill)
Sailor Moon (Naru Osaka)
Sailor Moon Crystal (Keiko Tomoe)
Dragon Ball Kai (Videl, Pan)
Fight! Kickers (Shinsuke Koga)
Mama wa Shōgaku 4 Nensei (Kiyoko Takashimaya)
Shōnen Santa no Daibôken (Luweny (ep. 24), Twenty)
Sally the Witch 2 (Suzuko)
Sorcerer Hunters (girl (ep. 13))
Urusei Yatsura

OVAs
Be-Bop High School (Satomi)
Down Load - Namiamidabutsu wa Ai no Uta (Yoko)
End of the World (Kazumi)
Karura Mau (Setsuko)
Legend of the Galactic Heroes
Shōnan Bakusōzoku (Announcer (ep. 3), Vice President (ep. 7))

Video games
Yaiba: Ninja Gaiden Z (Momiji)

References

External links
 Official agency profile 
 

1965 births
Living people
Aoni Production voice actors
Japanese video game actresses
Japanese voice actresses
Voice actresses from Setagaya
20th-century Japanese actresses
21st-century Japanese actresses